The 2005 Spa DTM round was a motor racing event for the Deutsche Tourenwagen Masters held between 13–15 May 2005. The event, part of the 19th season of the DTM, was held at the Circuit de Spa-Francorchamps in Belgium.

Results

Qualifying

Race

Championship standings after the race 

 Note: Only the top five positions are included for three sets of standings.

References

External links 
Official website

|- style="text-align:center"
| width="35%"| Previous race:
| width="30%"| Deutsche Tourenwagen Masters2005 season
| width="40%"| Next race:

Lausitzring DTM
Deutsche Tourenwagen Masters